Amara is a 2014 Tamil language film written, filmed and directed by M. Jeevan. The film was produced by S.A. Jalavudhin who had previously produced Sengathu (2006). Starring Amaran, Sruthi Ramakrishnan and Ashish Vidyarthi, the film released on 28 February 2014.

Cast

 Amaran as Amara
 Sruthi Ramakrishnan as Thenmozhi
 Ashish Vidyarthi as Sethupathi
 Sampath Raj as Sakthivel
 Ganja Karuppu as Adaikkalam
 Livingston as Sebastian 
 Vaiyapuri
 Mahanadi Shankar
 Gowthami Vembunathan
 Tharika in a special appearance

Soundtrack 
The soundtrack is composed by D. Imman.

Critical reception
The Times of India gave the film 1.5 stars out of 5 and wrote, "Director Jeevan has tried hard to come up with a story that hasn't been told on screen before...Unfortunately for him, his twists aren't backed enough by logical sequences, thereby making the film and its story totally unconvincing" and further stated, "Amara...comes across as a tiresome affair". The New Indian Express wrote, "a meandering screenplay and insipid narration ensures that the film is a tiring, monotonous experience...With nothing going for it, ‘Amara’ is a wasted effort".

References

External links
 

2014 films
2010s Tamil-language films